These works were written or edited by the American fiction writer Andre Norton (Andre Alice Norton, born Alice Mary Norton, 1912–2005). Before 1960 she used the pen name Andrew North several times and, jointly with Grace Allen Hogarth, Allen Weston once.

Norton is known best for science-fiction and fantasy, or speculative fiction, a field where her work was first published in the 1950s. She also wrote crime fiction, romantic fiction, and historical fiction, mainly before 1960. The term non-genre distinguishes that other work here, which expresses the perspective of the Internet Speculative Fiction Database (ISFDB).

Single titles 
 The Prince Commands, being sundry adventures of Michael Karl, sometime crown prince & pretender to the throne of Morvania (D. Appleton–Century Company, 1934; republished by Open Road Media, 2014), illustrated by Kate Seredy – nongenre
 Ralestone Luck (Appleton–Century, 1938 ), illus. James Reid – nongenre – complete text via Project Gutenberg
 Follow the Drum, being the ventures and misadventures of one Johanna Lovell, sometime lady of Catkept manor in Kent county of Lord Baltimore's proprietary of Maryland, in the gracious reign of King Charles the Second (New York: William Penn Publishing Corp., 1942) – nongenre
 Rogue Reynard (Houghton Mifflin, 1947), chapterbook, illus. Laura Bannon – nongenre
 Scarface, being the story of one Justin Blade, late of the pirate isle of Tortuga, and how fate did justly deal with him, to his great profit (Harcourt, Brace, 1948), illus. Lorence Bjorklund – nongenre
 Huon of the Horn, being a tale of that Duke of Bordeaux who came to sorrow at the hands of Charlemagne and yet won the favor of Oberon, the Elf King, to his lasting fame and great glory (Harcourt, Brace, 1951), illustrated by Joe Krush –  "Based upon the English translation by Sir John Bourchier, Lord Berners, as it appears in the publications of the Early English Text Society."
 Star Man's Son, 2250 A.D. (Harcourt, Brace, 1952), illus. Nicholas Mordvinoff – (also issued 1954 as Daybreak: 2250 A.D., as an Ace Double with Beyond Earth's Gates by Lewis Padgett; reissued 1978 as Star Man's Son)
 Murders for Sale (1954; reissued 1992 as Sneeze on Sunday; republished by Wildside Press in 2011), by Norton and Grace Allen Hogarth as Allen Weston – nongenre
 Yankee Privateer (World Pub. Co., 1955), illus. Leonard W. Vosburgh – nongenre
 Stand to Horse (1956) – nongenre
 Sea Siege (1957)
 Star Gate (1958)
 Secret of the Lost Race (1959, as an Ace Double with One Against Herculum by Jerry Sohl; reissued 1977 as Wolfshead)
 Shadow Hawk (1960) – nongenre (set during the reign of Sekenenre III)
 The Sioux Spaceman (1960, as an Ace Double with And Then the Town Took Off by Richard Wilson, reissued 1966 as standalone)
 Star Hunter (1961, as an Ace Double with Voodoo Planet)
 Eye of the Monster (1962, as an Ace Double with Sea Siege)
 The X Factor (1965)
 Operation Time Search (1967)
 Bertie and May (1969), with Bertha Stemm Norton – nongenre
 High Sorcery, collection
 Ice Crown (1970)
 Android at Arms (1971)
 Garan the Eternal (1972), collection
 Breed to Come (1972)
 Here Abide Monsters (1973)
 The Many Worlds of Andre Norton (1974), collection, edited by Roger Elwood; also issued as The Book of Andre Norton
 Iron Cage (1974)
 Outside (Walker & Co., 1974), chapterbook, illus. Bernard Colonna
 The Day of the Ness (Walker, 1975), chapterbook by Norton and Michael Gilbert, illus. Michael Gilbert
 The White Jade Fox (1975)
 Merlin's Mirror (1975)
 No Night Without Stars (1975)
 Knave of Dreams (1975)
 Wraiths of Time (1976)
 Perilous Dreams (1976), collection
 The Opal-eyed Fan (1977) – nongenre
 Velvet Shadows (1977) – nongenre
 Yurth Burden (1978)
 Seven Spells to Sunday (1979), with Phyllis Miller
 Snow Shadow (1979) – nongenre
 Voorloper (1980), illus. Wojciech Siudmak, and Alicia Austin
 Iron Butterflies (1980) – nongenre
 Maid at Arms (1981), with Enid Cushing (Norton not named on the cover)
 Ten Mile Treasure (1981) – nongenre
 Moon Called (1982)
 Caroline (1983), with Enid Cushing – nongenre
 Wheel of Stars (1983)
 House of Shadows (1984), with Phyllis Miller
 Stand and Deliver (1984) – nongenre, sequel to Yankee Privateer
 Ride the Green Dragon (1985), with Phyllis Miller – nongenre
 Serpent's Tooth (Andre Norton, Ltd., 1987), chapterbook, illus. Mary Hanson-Roberts – limited edition of 999 copies
 Moon Mirror (1988), collection, illus. Anne Yvonne Gilbert
 The Jekyll Legacy (1990), with Robert Bloch
 Sneeze on Sunday (1992), with Grace Allen Hogarth, mystery
 Brother to Shadows (1993)
 Tiger Burning Bright (1995), with Marion Zimmer Bradley and Mercedes Lackey
 The Monster's Legacy (1996)
 Three Hands for Scorpio (2005)

Series

Astra, or Pax
A sequence of two novels, starting with the first interstellar flight made by humans escaping a tyrannical civilization on Earth.
The Stars Are Ours! (1954; reissued 1955 as an Ace Double with Three Faces of Time by Sam Merwin, Jr.)
Star Born (1957; reissued 1958 as an Ace Double with A Planet for Texans by H. Beam Piper and John J. McGuire) – complete text via Project Gutenberg

Beast Master (Hosteen Storm)
The story of ex-soldier Hosteen Storm and his companions, a group of genetically altered animals with whom he has a telepathic connection.
The Beast Master (1959)
Lord of Thunder (1962)
Beast Master's Ark (2002), with Lyn McConchie
Beast Master's Circus (2004), with Lyn McConchie
Beast Master's Quest (2006), with Lyn McConchie

Cycle of Oak, Yew, Ash, and Rowan 
Also known as The Book of Oak, Yew, Ash, and Rowan.

 To the King a Daughter: The Book of the Oak (2000), with Sasha Miller
 Knight or Knave: The Book of the Yew (2001), with Sasha Miller
 A Crown Disowned: The Book of the Ash and the Rowan (2002), with Sasha Miller
 Dragon Blade: The Book of the Rowan (2005), with Sasha Miller
 Knight of the Red Beard (2008), with Sasha Miller

Carolus Rex
The Shadow of Albion (1999), with Rosemary Edghill
Leopard in Exile (2001), with Rosemary Edghill

Central Asia
Two books by Norton and Susan Shwartz.
Imperial Lady: A Fantasy of Han China (1989) 
Empire of the Eagle (1993)

Central Control
Military SF in a milieu where humans are initially only permitted out into the wider universe as mercenaries.
Star Rangers (1953; also issued 1955 as Ace Double The Last Planet with A Man Obsessed by Alan E. Nourse)
Star Guard (1955; also issued 1956 as Ace Double with Planet of No Return by Poul Anderson)

Crosstime (Blake Walker)
A young time-traveler attempts to stop a tyrant from conquering all of reality.
The Crossroads of Time (1956, as an Ace Double with Mankind On the Run by Gordon R. Dickson; first published alone in 1962)
Quest Crosstime (1965; also issued as Crosstime Agent, UK, 1975)

Drew Rennie
Westerns starring a former Confederate soldier.
Ride Proud, Rebel! (1961) – complete text via Project Gutenberg
Rebel Spurs (1962) – complete text via Project Gutenberg

Elvenbane, or the Halfblood Chronicles
The Halfblood Chronicles fantasy series by Norton and Mercedes Lackey.
The Elvenbane (1991)
Elvenblood (1995)
Elvenborn (2002)
Elvenbred (TBD, but likely cancelled due to copyright issues following Norton's death in 2005)

Five Senses
Loosely connected fantasies, each concentrating on one of the five senses.
The Hands of Lyr (Touch) (1994)
Mirror of Destiny (Sight) (1995)
The Scent of Magic (Smell) (1998)
Wind in the Stone (Hearing) (1999)
A Taste of Magic (Taste) (2006) with Jean Rabe

Lorens Van Norreys
About a Dutch espionage agent during and after World War II.
 The Sword is Drawn (Houghton Mifflin, 1944), illus. Duncan Coburn
 Sword in Sheath (Harcourt, Brace, 1949), illus. Lorence Bjorklund (published in the UK as Island of the Lost, 1953)
At Swords' Points (Harcourt, Brace, 1954)

The Magic Sequence
Steel Magic (1965; also issued as Gray Magic, 1967)
Octagon Magic (1967)
Fur Magic (1968)
Dragon Magic (1972)
Lavender-Green Magic (1974)
Red Hart Magic (1976)
Dragon Mage: A Sequel to Dragon Magic (2008), by Norton and Jean Rabe

Mark of the Cat
The Mark of the Cat (1992)
Mark of the Cat, Year of the Rat (2002) – The Mark of the Cat packaged with a new and related novel

Quag Keep
Part of the Greyhawk campaign setting for Dungeons & Dragons.
Quag Keep (1979)
Return to Quag Keep (2005), Norton and Jean Rabe

Star Ka'at
Four novels by Norton and Dorothy Madlee.
Star Ka'at (1976)
Star Ka'at World (1978)
Star Ka'ats and the Plant People (1979)
Star Ka'ats and the Winged Warriors (1981)

The Time Traders (Ross Murdock)
Time agents Ross Murdock and Travis Fox travel through time and space to safeguard Earth.
The Time Traders (1958)
Galactic Derelict (1959)
The Defiant Agents (1962)
Key Out of Time (1963)
Firehand (1994), with P. M. Griffin
Echoes in Time (1999), with Sherwood Smith
Atlantis Endgame (2002), with Sherwood Smith

Trillium, or World of the Three Moons
Only the third book was written solely by Norton; the first book was a collaboration of Norton, Marion Zimmer Bradley and Julian May. The other books are included here for completeness but had no input from Norton. For further details see Trillium series.
Black Trillium (1990), with Marion Zimmer Bradley and Julian May
Blood Trillium (1993), by Julian May
Golden Trillium (1993), by Andre Norton	
Lady of the Trillium (1995), by Marion Zimmer Bradley
Sky Trillium (1997), by Julian May

Free Traders universe

Dark Piper (1968) - Vere Collis and his companions are the only human survivors on the planet Beltane
Dread Companion (1970) - Kilda is governess to a child with a magical companion on the planet Dylan

Dipple
Stories featuring people displaced by interstellar war trying to escape their status as "dipples".
Catseye (1961)
Night of Masks (1964)

Forerunner
Featuring the Forerunners, an incomprehensible yet powerful vanished alien race whose artefacts survive them.
Storm Over Warlock (1960)
Ordeal in Otherwhere (1964)
Forerunner Foray (1973)
Forerunner (1981) – the first book published by Tom Doherty Associates under the Tor Books imprint
Forerunner: The Second Venture (1985)

Janus
The story of Naill Renfro who, changed by an alien artefact, sets out to protect the planet of Janus from external threats.
Judgment on Janus (1963; also issued as Judgement on Janus)
Victory on Janus (1966)

Moon Magic or Moon Singer
A series following free trader Krip Vorlund, psychic sorceress Lady Maelen, and their telepathic companions.
Moon of Three Rings (1966)
Exiles of the Stars (1971)
Flight in Yiktor (1986)
Dare to Go A-Hunting (1989)

Solar Queen
A series following the Free Traders on the Solar Queen starship under captain Jellico exploring and making contact with new worlds.
Sargasso of Space (1955, as by Andrew North; reissued 1957 as an Ace Double with The Cosmic Puppets by Philip K. Dick)
Plague Ship (1956, as by Andrew North; reissued 1959 as an Ace Double with Voodoo Planet) – complete text via Project Gutenberg
Voodoo Planet (1959, as by Andrew North; issued only as an Ace Double, first with Plague Ship and in 1968 with Star Hunter) – complete text via Project Gutenberg
Postmarked the Stars (1969)
Redline the Stars (1993), with P. M. Griffin
Derelict for Trade (1997), with Sherwood Smith
A Mind for Trade (1997), with Sherwood Smith

Zero Stone (Murdoc Jern)
A series following Murdoc Jern, son of a murdered interstellar gem trader, who discovers that the ring his father left him contains one of the powerful Zero Stones.
The Zero Stone (1968)
Uncharted Stars (1969)

Witch World

Estcarp Cycle 
Witch World (1963)
Web of the Witch World (1964)
Three Against the Witch World (1965)
Warlock of the Witch World (1967)
Sorceress of the Witch World (1968)
Trey of Swords (1977)
Ware Hawk (1983)
The Gate of the Cat (1987)
Ciara's Song (1998), with Lyn McConchie
The Duke's Ballad (2005), with Lyn McConchie

High Hallack Cycle 
 Year of the Unicorn (1965)
 The Crystal Gryphon (1972) – first book of the Gryphon trilogy
 Spell of the Witch World (1972), collection
 The Jargoon Pard (1974) - sequel to Year of the Unicorn
 Zarsthor's Bane (1978)
 Lore of the Witch World (1980), collection
 Gryphon in Glory (1981) – second book of the Gryphon trilogy
 Horn Crown (1981)
 Gryphon's Eyrie (1984), with A. C. Crispin – third book of the Gryphon trilogy
 Were-Wrath (Cheap Street, 1984), chapterbook, illus. Judy King-Rieniets – limited edition of 177 copies, very rare
 Wizards' Worlds (1989), collection - contains all of the stories from the previous collection Lore of the Witch World except "Legacy from Sorn Fen", as well as additional stories including "Were-Wrath"
 Songsmith (1992), with A. C. Crispin
 Silver May Tarnish (2005), with Lyn McConchie

The Turning 
Storms of Victory (omnibus) (1991) contains Port of Dead Ships by Andre Norton & Seakeep by P. M. Griffin
Flight of Vengeance (omnibus) (1992) contains Exile by Mary H. Schaub & Falcon Hope by P. M. Griffin
On Wings of Magic (omnibus) (1994) contains We the Women by Patricia Mathews & Falcon Magic by Sasha Miller

Secrets of the Witch World 
(also part of The Turning)

The Key of the Keplian (1995) with Lyn McConchie
The Magestone (1996) with Mary H. Schaub
The Warding of Witch World (1996)

Witch World anthologies edited 
Tales of the Witch World 1 (1987) – Norton wrote the introduction and Of the Shaping of Ulm's Heir
Four from the Witch World (1989) – Norton wrote the introduction
Tales of the Witch World 2 (1988) – Norton wrote the introduction
Tales of the Witch World 3 (1990) – Norton wrote the introduction

Omnibus editions
The Beast Master / Star Hunter (1961, an Ace Double)
Eye of the Monster / Sea Siege (1962, an Ace Double)
Star Hunter / Voodoo Planet (1968, an Ace Double)
Star Hunter and Voodoo Planet (1980, contains both Star Hunter and Voodoo Planet but is not an Ace Double)
Sword Series Trilogy (1984 boxed set containing The Sword is Drawn, Sword in Sheath and At Swords' Point)
Witch World: Swords and Spells (omnibus) (SFBC) (1987) contains Trey of Swords, Ware Hawk & The Gate of the Cat
The Magic Books (1988 omnibus of Fur Magic, Steel Magic and Octagon Magic)
Annals of the Witch World (omnibus) (SFBC) (1994) also published as The Gates to Witch World contains Witch World, Web of Witch World & Year of the Unicorn
Chronicles of the Witch World (omnibus) (SFBC) (1998) also published as Lost Lands of Witch World contains Three Against the Witch World, Warlock of the Witch World & Sorceress of the Witch World
Time Traders (2000 omnibus of The Time Traders and Galactic Derelict)
Time Traders II (2001 omnibus of The Defiant Agents and Key Out of Time)
The Gates to Witch World (omnibus) (TOR) (2001) also published as Annals of the Witch World contains Witch World, Web of Witch World & Year of the Unicorn
Secrets of the Witch World (omnibus) (2001) contains Key of the Keplain, The Magestone & The Warding of Witch World – released as Digital Media Only
Star Soldiers (2001 omnibus of Star Guard and Star Rangers)
Time Traders III (2002 omnibus of Echoes in Time and Atlantis Endgame)
Warlock (2002 omnibus of Storm Over Warlock, Ordeal in Otherwhere and Forerunner Foray)
Janus (2002 omnibus of Judgment on Janus and Victory on Janus)
Darkness and Dawn (2003 omnibus of Daybreak – 2250 AD & No Night Without Stars)
Solar Queen (2003 omnibus of Sargasso of Space and Plague Ship)
Lost Lands of Witch World (omnibus) (TOR) (2004) also published as Chronicles of the Witch World contains Three Against the Witch World, Warlock of the Witch World & Sorceress of the Witch World
Gods and Androids (2004 omnibus of Android at Arms and Wraiths of Time)
Beast Master Team (2004, omnibus of Beast Master's Ark and Beast Master's Circus)
Beast Master's Planet (2005, omnibus of Beast Master and Lord of Thunder)
Masks of the Outcasts (2005 omnibus of Catseye and Night of Masks)
Dark Companion (2005 omnibus of Dark Piper and Dread Companion)
Moonsinger (2006 omnibus of Moon of Three Rings and Exiles of the Stars)
Quag Keep & Return to Quag Keep (2006 omnibus of Quag Keep and Return to Quag Keep)
From the Sea To the Stars (2007 omnibus of Sea Siege and Star Gate)
Star Flight (2007 omnibus edition of The Stars are Ours! and Star Born)
Crosstime (2008 omnibus of The Crossroads of Time and Quest Crosstime)
Search for the Star Stones (2008 omnibus of The Zero Stone and Uncharted Stars)
The Game of Stars and Comets (2009 omnibus of The Sioux Spaceman, The Eye of the Monster, The X Factor and Voorloper)
Deadly Dreams (2011 omnibus of Perilous Dreams and Knave of Dreams)
Moonsinger's Quest (2011 omnibus of Flight in Yiktor and Dare to Go A-Hunting)
Ice and Shadow (2012 omnibus of Ice Crown and Brother to Shadows)
The Forerunner Factor (2012 omnibus of Forerunner & Forerunner: The Second Venture)
The Iron Breed (2013 omnibus of Iron Cage and Breed to Come)
Children of the Gates (2013 omnibus of Here Abide Monsters and Yurth Burden)
Secret of the Stars (2014 omnibus of Secret of the Lost Race and Star Hunter)
Tales from High Hallack (2014 short story omnibus in three volumes)

Short stories
Some short stories appear in multiple books but only one book publication is listed for each.

"Black Irish" (1939), Boys' Life
"Freedom" (1943), poem, Cleveland Press, September

 "People of the Crater" (1947), as by Andrew North, Fantasy Book, Vol. 1. No. 1; also issued as "Garin of Tav" (1972) – Garan the Eternal
 "The Gifts of Asti" (1948), as by Andrew North, Fantasy Book, Vol. 1, No. 3 – The Book of Andre Norton – complete text via Project Gutenberg
 "All Cats Are Gray" (1953), as by Andrew North, Fantastic Universe, Aug./Sep. 1953 – The Book of Andre Norton – complete text via Project Gutenberg
"Mousetrap" (1954) – The Book of Andre Norton
"By A Hair" (1958) – High Sorcery
"The Boy and the Ogre" (1966) – Golden Magazine, September 1966
"The Toymaker's Snuffbox" (1966) – Moon Mirror
"Wizards' Worlds" (1967) – High Sorcery
"Garan of Yu-Lac" (1969) – Garan the Eternal
"Toys of Tamisan" (1969) – High Sorcery
"Long Live Lord Kor!" (1970) – The Book of Andre Norton
"Through the Needle's Eye" (1970) – High Sorcery
"Ully the Piper" (1970) – High Sorcery
"Ghost Tour" (1971) – Witchcraft and Sorcery, Vol. 1, No. 5, Feb. 1971
"Amber out of Quayth" (1972) – Spell of Witch World
"Artos, Son of Marius" (1972) – Dragon Magic
"Dragon Scale Silver" (1972) – Spell of Witch World
"Dream Smith" (1972) – Spell of Witch World
"Legacy from Sorn Fen" (1972) – Garan the Eternal
"One Spell Wizard" (1972) – Garan the Eternal
"A Desirable Lakeside Residence" (1973) – Moon Mirror
"London Bridge" (1973) – The Book of Andre Norton
"Teddi" (1973) – Moon Mirror
"The Toads of Grimmerdale" (1973) – The Book of Andre Norton
"The Long Night of Waiting" (1974) – The Book of Andre Norton
"Outside" (1974) – Moon Mirror
"Cats" (1976), poem – Omniumgathum by Jonathan Bacon
"The Last Cohort" (1976), poem – Omniumgathum
"Song of the Barbarian Swordsman" (1976), poem – Omniumgathum by Jonathan Bacon
"Get Out of My Dream!" (1976) – Perilous Dreams
"Nightmare" (1976) – Perilous Dreams
"Ship of Mist" (1976) – Perilous Dreams
"Spider Silk" (1976) – Lore of the Witch World
"Sword of Ice" (1977) – Trey of Swords
"Sword of Lost Battles" (1977) – Trey of Swords
"Sword of Shadow" (1977) – Trey of Swords
"Sword of Unbelief" (1977) – Lore of the Witch World
"Falcon Blood" (1979) – Lore of the Witch World
"Sand Sister" (1979) – Lore of the Witch World
"Changeling" (1980) – Lore of the Witch World
"Moon Mirror" (1982) – Moon Mirror
"Swamp Dweller" (1985) – Magic of Ithkar 1
"Of the Shaping of Ulm's Heir" (1987) – Tales of the Witch World 1
"Rider on a Mountain" (1987) – Friends of the Horseclans by Robert Adams
"Serpent's Tooth" (1987 limited ed. chapterbook, above) – The SFWA Grand Masters, Vol. 2 by Frederik Pohl
"The Dowry of the Rag Picker's Daughter" (1988) – Arabesques by Susan Shwartz
"How Many Miles to Babylon?" (1988) – Moon Mirror
"Noble Warrior" (1989) – Catfantastic
"Hob's Pot" (1991) – Catfantastic II
"The Silent One" (1991) – Chilled to the Bone by Robert T. Garcia
"The Chronicler: `There was a time ...`" (1991) – Storms of Victory
"The Chronicler: `Once I was Duratan ...`" (1992) – Flight of Vengeance
"The Nabob's Gift" (1992) – All Hallows Eve: Tales of Love and the Supernatural by Mary Elizabeth Allen
"Nine Threads of Gold" (1992) – After the King by Martin H. Greenberg
"That Which Overfloweth" (1992) – Grails; Quest of the Dawn by Richard Gillium
"A Very Dickensy Christmas" (1992) – The Magic of Christmas by John Silbersack
"The Chronicler: `There are places `" (1994) – On Wings of Magic
"Noble Warrior Meets with a Ghost" (1994) – Catfantastic III
"The Last Spell" (1995) – Ancient Enchantresses by Kathleen M. Massie-Ferch
"The Way Wind" (1995) – Sisters in Fantasy, Vol. 1 by Susan Shwartz and Martin H. Greenberg
"Auour the Deepminded" (1996) – Warrior Enchantresses by Kathleen M. Massie-Ferch
"No Folded Hands" (1996) – The Williamson Effect by Roger Zelazny
"Noble Warrior; Teller of Fortunes" (1996) – Catfantastic IV
"Bard's Crown" (1997) – Elf Fantastic by Martin H. Greenberg
"Frog Magic" (1997) – Wizard Fantastic by Martin H. Greenberg
"Herne's Lady" (1998) – Lamps on the Brow by James Cahill
"The Outling" (1998) – Lord of the Fantastic: Fantastic Stories in Honor of Roger Zelazny by Martin H. Greenberg
"The Stonish Men" (1998) – On Crusade: More Tales of the Knights Templar by Katherine Kurtz
"Churchyard Yew" (1999) – Dangerous Magic by Denise Little
"Noble Warrior and the `Gentleman`" (1999) – Catfantastic V
"Root and Branch Shall Change" (1999) – Merlin by Martin H. Greenberg
"White Violets" (1999) – Marion Zimmer Bradley's Fantasy Magazine, Autumn 1999
"Needle and Dream" (2000) – Perchance to Dream by Denise Little
"Procession to Var" (2000) – Guardsmen of Tomorrow by Martin H. Greenberg
"Set in Stone" (2000) – Far Frontiers by Martin H. Greenberg
"Ravenmere" (2001) – Historical Hauntings by Jean Rabe
"Three-Inch Trouble" (2001) – A Constellation of Cats by Denise Little
"The End is the Beginning" (2002) – Oceans of Space by Brian Thomsen
"The Familiar" (2002) – Familiars by Denise Little
"Red Cross, White Cross" (2002) – Knight Fantastic by Martin H. Greenberg
"Sow's Ear – Silk Purse" (2002) – 30th Anniversary DAW: Fantasy by Elizabeth R. Wollheim
"Earthborne" (2004) – Masters of Fantasy by Bill Fawcett and Brian Thomsen
"The Cobwebbed Princess" (2005) – Magic Tails by Martin H. Greenberg and Janet Pack
"Faire Likeness" (2005) – Renaissance Faire

Anthologies edited
This section does not include four Witch World anthologies.

Bullard of the Space Patrol (Cleveland: World Publishing Company, 1951), collection of stories by Malcolm Jameson, edited with an introduction by Norton
Space Service (World, 1953), ed. with introduction by Norton
Space Pioneers (World, 1954), ed. with preface by Norton
Space Police (World, 1956), ed. with foreword by Norton
Gates to Tomorrow: An Introduction to Science Fiction (1973), ed. with Ernestine Donaldy
Small Shadows Creep (1974) 
Baleful Beasts and Eerie Creatures (1976), ed. with Rod Ruth, introduction by Norton
Grand Masters' Choice (1989), ed. with Ingrid Zierhut and Robert Bloch, includes "The Toads Of Grimmerdale" by Norton
Renaissance Faire (2005), ed. with Jean Rabe, introduction and "Faire Likeness" by Norton

Catfantastic
Five anthologies edited by Norton and Martin H. Greenberg, published by DAW books.

 Catfantastic: Nine Lives and Fifteen Tales (1989), introduction and "Noble Warrior" by Norton
 Catfantastic II (1991; also issued as Fantastic Cat), introduction by Norton and Greenberg, "Hob's Pot" by Norton
 Catfantastic III (1994), introduction and "Noble Warrior Meets with a Ghost" by Norton
 Catfantastic IV (1996), introduction and "Noble Warrior, Teller of Fortunes" by Norton
 Catfantastic V (1999), introduction and "Noble Warrior and the "Gentleman"" by Norton

Magic in Ithkar
Four anthologies edited by Norton and Robert Adams, published by Tor Books. Adams is credited with the four Prologues and the Biographical Notes for volume 4, Norton with the Biographical Notes for volume 1 (vols. 2 and 3 not credited).
Magic in Ithkar (1985), includes "Swamp Dweller" by Norton
Magic in Ithkar 2 (1985)
Magic in Ithkar 3 (1986)
Magic in Ithkar 4 (1987)

Works by Andre Norton published exclusively at Andre-Norton.com

 The Cat Who Used His Wits - (ss)
 Explorer IV - (ss)
 The Fat Troll - (ss)
 Fanus - (ss) 
 The Hobyahs - (ss) 
 The Legend of the Fairy Stone - (ss)
 The Knights of the Fish - (ss)
 Place by the Window - (ss)
 Ring of Stone - (ss)
 Rusted Armor - (ss)
 Rusted Armor - (novel co-authored with Caroline Fike)
 The Scribbling Women - (text book for universities covering female Victorian authors)
 Strong Medicine - (ss)
 The Telling of Tales - (collection of 13 previously unpublished short stories.
 Trouble in Mayapan - (fourth novel in the Lorens Van Norreys series)
 Ully the Piper (draft) - (ss)
 Water Wizard - (ss)
 Who Dreams of Dragons? - (ss) Dedicated to Anne McCaffrey
 Yankee Camels - (ss)

Non-fiction
Journal articles

Notes

References

External links
 Andre-Norton.com, "The Estate Authorized Andre Norton Website." — includes bibliography and much more.
 Bibliography at www.andre-norton.org — Not a complete list of novels
 
 
 

Works

 
 
 

 

Bibliographies of American writers
Fantasy bibliographies
Science fiction bibliographies